To Live in Peace (Italian: Vivere in pace) is a 1947 Italian neorealist comedy-drama war film directed by Luigi Zampa and starring Aldo Fabrizi, John Kitzmiller and Ave Ninchi.

It was shot at the Cinecittà Studios in Rome and on location around Orvieto in Umbria. The film's sets were designed by the art director Ivo Battelli.

Cast
Aldo Fabrizi as Tigna
Gar Moore as Ronald
Mirella Monti as Silvia
John Kitzmiller as Joe
Heinrich Bode as Hans
Ave Ninchi as Corinna
 Ernesto Almirante as Il Nonno
 Nando Bruno as Il Segretario Politico
 Aldo Silvani as Il Medico
 Gino Cavalieri as Il Parroco
 Piero Palermini as Franco
 Franco Serpilli as Citto

Awards and nominations
 OCIC-Prize at The World Film and Fine Arts Festival in Brussels, 1947: OCIC jury verdict : This film is amongst the films presented most able to contribute to the spiritual and moral revival of humanity. This first jury of the International Catholic Office of Cinema (OCIC) consisted out of the Jesuit Fr Charles Reinert (Switzerland), the Dominican Fr Léo Lunders O.P. (Belgium), Diego Fabbri (Italy), Luis de Zulueta (Spain), André Ruszkowski (France) and Roger Stengel (Belgium)

References

Bibliography
 Ben-Ghiat, Ruth. Italian Fascism's Empire Cinema. Indiana University Press, 2015.
 Chiti, Roberto & Poppi, Roberto. Dizionario del cinema italiano: Dal 1945 al 1959. Gremese Editore, 1991.
 Gundle, Stephen. Fame Amid the Ruins: Italian Film Stardom in the Age of Neorealism. Berghahn Books, 2019.

External links

 

1947 films
1947 comedy-drama films
Italian black-and-white films
Films scored by Nino Rota
1940s Italian-language films
Italian World War II films
Films set in Italy
Social realism in film
Films directed by Luigi Zampa
Italian comedy-drama films
Films with screenplays by Suso Cecchi d'Amico
Films shot at Cinecittà Studios
Lux Film films
1940s Italian films